Shonbeh and Tasuj District is in Dashti County, Bushehr province, Iran. At the 2006 census, its population was 7,308 in 1,546 households. The following census in 2011 counted 7,903 people in 1,930 households. At the latest census in 2016, the district had 8,621 inhabitants living in 2,393 households.

A strong earthquake measuring 6.1 struck the town of Shonbeh and villages of Shonbeh and Tasuj District on 9 April 2013, killing at least thirty-seven people.

See also
2013 Bushehr earthquake

References 

Districts of Bushehr Province
Populated places in Dashti County